Cerastis is a genus of moths of the family Noctuidae.

Species
 Cerastis faceta (Treitschke, 1835)
 Cerastis leucographa (Denis & Schiffermüller, 1775) – white-marked
 Cerastis orientalis Boursin, 1948
 Cerastis pallescens (Butler, 1878)
 Cerastis robertsoni Crabo & Lafontaine, 1997
 Cerastis rubricosa (Denis & Schiffermüller, 1775) – red chestnut
 Cerastis tenebrifera – reddish speckled dart
 Cerastis violetta Boursin, 1955
Subgenus Metalepsis
 Cerastis cornuta (Grote, 1874)
 Cerastis enigmatica Crabo & Lafontaine, 1997
 Cerastis fishii (Grote, 1878)
 Cerastis gloriosa Crabo & Lafontaine, 1997
 Cerastis salicarum (Walker, 1857)

References
 Cerastis at Markku Savela's Lepidoptera and Some Other Life Forms
 Natural History Museum Lepidoptera genus database
 Crabo, Lars and J. Donald Lafontaine. 1997. A Revision of the Cerastis cornuta group of the geunus Cerastis subgenus Metalepsis (Noctuidae)

Noctuinae
Taxa named by Ferdinand Ochsenheimer